Tekomyia is a genus of midges in the family Cecidomyiidae. The one described species - Tekomyia populi - is found in the Palearctic realm. The genus was established in 1960 by German entomologist Edwin Möhn.

References

Cecidomyiidae genera

Insects described in 1960
Taxa named by Edwin Möhn
Monotypic Diptera genera